James Innes Randolph, Jr. (October 25, 1837 – April 29, 1887) was a Confederate army officer, lawyer,  and poet.

Early life and education
Randolph was born in Winchester, Virginia and attended Hobart College in Geneva, New York and was a graduate of the State and National Law School in Poughkeepsie, New York.

Career

American Civil War
Randolph served in the Confederate army as a topographical engineer in the American Civil War, reaching the rank of major.

Writings
After the war, he moved to Baltimore, Maryland to practice law. After giving up the practice, he wrote editorials for the Baltimore American in addition to poems. He continued writing and living in Baltimore until his death in April 1887.

His best known poem is "I'm A Good Ol' Rebel", in where he berates the U.S. and disparages its national symbols while praising the Confederacy, lamenting its defeat at the hands of the U.S.

References

External links 

1837 births
1887 deaths
Lawyers from Baltimore
People from Winchester, Virginia
People of Virginia in the American Civil War
Confederate States Army officers
Journalists from Maryland
Poets from Maryland
Poets from Virginia
Hobart and William Smith Colleges alumni
State and National Law School alumni
19th-century American lawyers
Pro-Confederate writers